West Tyrone (Ulster Scots: Wast Owenslann) is a constituency in the Northern Ireland Assembly.

The seat was first used for a Northern Ireland-only election for the Northern Ireland Forum in 1996. Since 1998, it has elected members to the current Assembly.

For Assembly elections prior to 1996, the constituency was largely part of the Mid Ulster constituency with a smaller section coming from Fermanagh and South Tyrone constituency. Since 1997, it has shared boundaries with the West Tyrone UK Parliament constituency.

For further details of the history and boundaries of the constituency, see West Tyrone (UK Parliament constituency).

Members

Note: The columns in this table are used only for presentational purposes, and no significance should be attached to the order of columns. For details of the order in which seats were won at each election, see the detailed results of that election.

Elections

Northern Ireland Assembly

2022

2017

2016

2011

2007

2003

1998

1996 forum
Successful candidates are shown in bold.

References

Tyrone West
Politics of County Tyrone
1996 establishments in Northern Ireland
Constituencies established in 1996